Geoffrey Bird may refer to:

Geoff Bird, musician
Geoffrey Bird of the Bird baronets

See also
Jeffrey Byrd (disambiguation)